Rachel Clarke (born 1972) is a British palliative care doctor and writer.

Formerly a current affairs journalist, Clarke attended medical school from 2003, qualifying as a doctor in 2009. During 2015–2016, she had an active voice in the dispute in the United Kingdom between junior doctors and the government over their contractual conditions of work, appearing in multiple television debates and interviews. Her best-selling memoir about life as a junior doctor, Your Life In My Hands, was published in 2017. Her second book, Dear Life, published in January 2020, explores death, dying and end-of-life care. Her third book, Breathtaking (2021), is an account of working inside the NHS during the UK’s first wave of COVID-19.

Biography 

Clarke studied philosophy, politics and economics at the University of Oxford and worked as a broadcast journalist prior to her career in medicine. She produced and directed current affairs documentaries for Channel 4 and the BBC focusing on subjects such as Al Qaeda, the Gulf War and the civil war in the Democratic Republic of Congo, otherwise known as the Second Congo War. At the age of 29, she began a medical degree at Oxford, graduating and beginning work as a junior doctor in 2009.

NHS campaigning 

Clarke's campaigning began when the Secretary of State for Health, Jeremy Hunt, sought to impose a new contract upon junior doctors. She rose to prominence as a political campaigner in her opposition to the contract. She argued in print and on screen that imposition would irrevocably damage the NHS. In particular, she was concerned that doctors would be unable to maintain their compassion and empathy, the attributes that drew them in to the profession in the first place. Clarke was interviewed multiple times during the COVID-19 Coronavirus pandemic in Spring 2020 and was a panellist on the BBC's Question Time on 16 April.

Clarke has criticised the 'Clap for Tom' following the death of Captain Sir Tom Moore as a shallow gesture, saying: "I cannot clap when 100k like Capt Tom have died ... Capt Tom was inspirational. But clapping doesn't feel right to me amid the vastness of our death & grief. Nor will clapping protect others."

On Twitter in late September 2021, then Telegraph cartoonist Bob Moran suggested Clarke deserved to be "verbally abused" after she tweeted that she had received verbal abuse for wearing a mask on public transport. In the exchange that followed, Clarke threatened to sue Moran for libel and accused him of inciting abuse. She further publicly tweeted at Moran's employer, the Telegraph, asking why they employ someone who abused NHS staff. On 13 October 2021, Press Gazette reported The Telegraph had sacked Moran over the comments. Following reports Moran had been suspended from his job, he had apologised a week earlier.

Books 
Her debut book Your Life in My Hands: A Junior Doctor's Story was published by Metro Books in July 2017.
The book covers her experiences working as a junior doctor on call, handling pain and trauma, NHS funding and the recruitment and retention of doctors and nurses, as well as her campaign against the UK Government's imposition of a contract on junior doctors. It was a Sunday Times best seller.

Her second book, Dear Life, a doctor's story of love and loss, exploring end-of-life care, was published by Little, Brown in January 2020.
It was long-listed for the 2020 Baillie Gifford Prize and short-listed for the 2020 Costa Book Awards. Robert MacFarlane described it as a remarkable book: "tender, funny, brave, heartfelt, radiant with love and life. It brought me often to laughter and - several  times - to tears. It sings with joy and kindness".

Clarke’s book, Breathtaking: Inside the NHS in a Time of Pandemic, was published by Little, Brown in January 2021. Based on her own experiences caring for patients with COVID-19, as well as interviews with colleagues, patients and their families, it reveals what life was like inside the NHS during the first wave of COVID-19 in the UK.

References

1972 births
Living people
English women medical doctors
English medical writers
Women documentary filmmakers